Ana Josefa Villanueva Fabián (born March 20, 1982 in Cotuí) is a karateka from the Dominican Republic who won the gold medal at the 2011 and 2015 Pan American Games.

Early age and personal life
Villanueva started practicing boxing and volleyball. She is a student of Accounting at Universidad Organización y Método and is a member of the Dominican Air Force; there she received the promotion to Sergeant major in 2011.

Ana took the money she collected after the 2011 Pan American Games winning, to repay the mortgage loan over her family house. They used the mortgage to fund the liver cancer treatment for one of Villanueva's brothers. She received an apartment from the government in 2017.

Career
Villanueva win the gold medal at the team kumite competition during the 2006 Central American and Caribbean Games, held in Colombia.

At the 2009 Central American and Caribbean Championship held in Santiago, Dominican Republic, Ana win the old medal at the Team Kumite category and the silver at the under 50 kg. The next year, she took the gold medal in under 50 kg and bronze in the open category medal at the 2010 Central American and Caribbean Championships

Ana took two bronze medals at the 2010 Central American and Caribbean Games, one in the under 50 kg, and the other at the team kumite competition.

2011
Villanueva won the gold medal in the kumite –50 at the Ibero-American Championship, held in Managua, Nicaragua.  Three months later, at the 2011 Pan American Games, Ana win the under 50 kg gold medal, defeating the Chilean Gabriela Bruna in the final match. For this winning she collected a RD$500,000 (approx. US$13,017 in November 2011) award by the President of the Dominican Republic, Mr. Leonel Fernández.

2012
For her achievements during 2011, Ana was selected in February along with Dionicio Gustavo, Karate Athlete of the year.  She was also one of the 10 nominees for the Dominican Republic Athlete of the Year, finally won by Luguelín Santos.

In March 2012, her hometown mayor awarded Ana for making them proud for her achievements.

2013
Villanueva won the silver medal of the IV Iberoamerican Championship after losing to Venezuelan Aurimer Campos 3-4. The then won the bronze medal in kumite -50 kg and gold in team kumite.

2021
In 2021, she competed at the World Olympic Qualification Tournament held in Paris, France hoping to qualify for the 2020 Summer Olympics in Tokyo, Japan. She was eliminated in her first match by Bakhriniso Babaeva of Uzbekistan.

References

1982 births
Living people
Dominican Republic female karateka
Karateka at the 2011 Pan American Games
Karateka at the 2015 Pan American Games
Pan American Games gold medalists for the Dominican Republic
Pan American Games medalists in karate
Central American and Caribbean Games gold medalists for the Dominican Republic
Central American and Caribbean Games silver medalists for the Dominican Republic
Central American and Caribbean Games bronze medalists for the Dominican Republic
Competitors at the 2006 Central American and Caribbean Games
Competitors at the 2010 Central American and Caribbean Games
Competitors at the 2014 Central American and Caribbean Games
Central American and Caribbean Games medalists in karate
Medalists at the 2011 Pan American Games
Medalists at the 2015 Pan American Games
20th-century Dominican Republic women
21st-century Dominican Republic women